Egyptian League Cup was an Egyptian football tournament. This championship was held once in 2000 and El Qanah from Port Said won the cup.

Finals

See also
 
 EFA League Cup

References

 
National association football league cups
Defunct football competitions in Egypt
2000 establishments in Egypt
2000 disestablishments in Egypt